Buzhan (Büjän) is a rural locality (a village) in Abulyaisovsky Selsoviet, Zianchurinsky District, Bashkortostan, Russia. The population was 72 as of 2010. There are two streets.

Geography 
Buzhan is located 60 km south of Isyangulovo (the district's administrative centre) by road. Malinovka is the nearest rural locality.

References 

Rural localities in Zianchurinsky District